The 2018–19 season was Tranmere Rovers' 135th season of existence and their first back in EFL League Two following promotion from the 2017–18 National League. Along with competing in League Two, the club participated in the FA Cup, EFL Cup and EFL Trophy. 

The season covers the period from 1 July 2018 to 30 June 2019

Transfers

Transfers in

Transfers out

Loans in

Loans out

Competitions

Friendlies
Tranmere Rovers announced friendlies with Dunfermline Athletic, Liverpool, Wigan Athletic, Warrington Town, Fleetwood Town, Chorley and Rochdale.

EFL League Two

League table

Results summary

Results by matchday

Matches
On 21 June 2018, the League Two fixtures for the forthcoming season were announced.

Play-offs

FA Cup

The first round draw was made live on BBC by Dennis Wise and Dion Dublin on 22 October. The draw for the second round was made live on BBC and BT by Mark Schwarzer and Glenn Murray on 12 November. The third round draw was made live on BBC by Ruud Gullit and Paul Ince from Stamford Bridge on 3 December 2018.

EFL Cup

On 15 June 2018, the draw for the first round was made in Vietnam.

EFL Trophy
On 13 July 2018, the initial group stage draw bar the U21 invited clubs was announced.

References

Tranmere Rovers
Tranmere Rovers F.C. seasons